The first Australian Club Lacrosse Championships were held in Adelaide, South Australia on 7 June 2008 and featured the premiers of the South Australian and Victorian men's and women's state league competitions from the previous year.

In 2009 the tournament was expanded to feature the premiers from the Western Australian league competitions, plus a wildcard entry for the fourth spot, given in the first instance to the previous year's national champion if they did not win their state league, or otherwise the non premiership team with the best home and away record for their league. With four teams in each of the men's and women's championships, semi finals are played to determine who plays in the championship final the following day.

The success of the event in its early years may lead to club national championships to become a permanent and regular fixture on the Australian Lacrosse calendar.

See also

Lacrosse in Australia
List of South Australian Lacrosse Premiers
List of Victorian Lacrosse Premiers
List of Western Australian Lacrosse Premiers

References

Australian Club Championship
Australia
Lacrosse